Deidra & Laney Rob a Train is an American comedy drama crime film directed by Sydney Freeland, from a screenplay by Shelby Farrell. It stars Ashleigh Murray, Rachel Crow, Tim Blake Nelson, David Sullivan, Danielle Nicolet and Sasheer Zamata.

The film had its world premiere at the Sundance Film Festival on January 23, 2017, before being released on March 17, 2017, by Netflix.

Plot 
Deidra & Laney's mother Marigold is taken to jail, and they are left to support themselves. To keep her sister Laney and younger brother Jet from being placed in foster care, Deidra makes a plan to rob trains. They need enough money to help pay their mother's bills and bail her out of jail. Along the way, they rekindle old relationships and find out who is real and to be trusted amongst their family and friends.

Cast
 Ashleigh Murray as Deidra, the older sister
 Rachel Crow as Laney, the younger sister
 Tim Blake Nelson as Truman, the Pacific Western detective
 David Sullivan as Chet, the father
 Danielle Nicolet as Marigold, the mother
 Sasheer Zamata as Ms. Spencer, the high school guidance counselor
 Missi Pyle as Mrs. Fowler
 Sharon Lawrence as Veronica
 Arturo Castro as McMillian, the local police officer
 Lance Gray as Jet, the little brother
 Brooke Markham as Claire, Laney's high school friend
 Kinna McInroe as Gloria, the child social services worker

Production
In June 2016, it was announced Ashleigh Murray, Rachel Crow, David Sullivan, Tim Blake Nelson, Danielle Nicolet, Sasheer Zamata and Arturo Castro had been cast in the film, with Sydney Freeland directing from a screenplay by Shelby Farrell, while Susan Cartsonis and Nick Moceri will produce the film, alongside Netflix who will finance and distribute the film.

Filming
Principal photography began in July 2016, in Utah in places including Ogden and Salt Lake City. Many of the railroad scenes were filmed in Heber City at the Heber Valley Railroad and all of the scenes at a school and prison were filmed at Judge Memorial Catholic High School.

Release
The film had its world premiere at the Sundance Film Festival on January 23, 2017. It was released on March 17, 2017 by Netflix.

Critical reception
Deidra and Laney Rob a Train received positive reviews from film critics.

See also
List of black films of the 2010s

References

External links
 

2017 films
American crime comedy-drama films
English-language Netflix original films
2010s crime comedy-drama films
2010s English-language films
2010s American films